is a Japanese male slalom canoeist who has competed at the international level since 2002. He won a bronze medal in the C1 event at the 2016 Summer Olympics in Rio de Janeiro, becoming the first Asian canoeist to win an Olympic medal.

He also won a gold medal in the C1 event at the 2014 Asian Games.

Haneda participated in four Olympic Games. At the 2008 Summer Olympics in Beijing he was eliminated in the qualifying round of the C1 event finishing in 14th place. At the 2012 Summer Olympics in London he was able to qualify for the final and finished in 7th place in the C1 event. He represented the host nation at the 2020 Summer Olympics in Tokyo, finishing in 10th place.

Haneda has lived and trained in Slovakia since the age of 18. He is coached by former Slovak canoeist Milan Kubáň.

World Cup individual podiums

1 Asia Canoe Slalom Championship counting for World Cup points
2 Oceania Canoe Slalom Open counting for World Cup points

References

External links

 
 

1987 births
Living people
People from Toyota, Aichi
Japanese male canoeists
Olympic canoeists of Japan
Canoeists at the 2008 Summer Olympics
Canoeists at the 2012 Summer Olympics
Canoeists at the 2016 Summer Olympics
Canoeists at the 2020 Summer Olympics
Asian Games medalists in canoeing
Canoeists at the 2010 Asian Games
Canoeists at the 2014 Asian Games
Canoeists at the 2018 Asian Games
Asian Games gold medalists for Japan
Asian Games silver medalists for Japan
Olympic bronze medalists for Japan
Olympic medalists in canoeing
Medalists at the 2016 Summer Olympics
Sportspeople from Aichi Prefecture
Japanese expatriates in Slovakia
Medalists at the 2010 Asian Games
Medalists at the 2014 Asian Games
Medalists at the 2018 Asian Games
21st-century Japanese people